İhsangazi District is a district of the Kastamonu Province of Turkey. Its seat is the town of İhsangazi. Its area is 445 km2, and its population is 5,292 (2021).

Composition
There is one municipality in İhsangazi District:
 İhsangazi

There are 23 villages in İhsangazi District:

 Akkaya
 Akkirpi
 Bedirgeriş
 Belençal
 Bozarmut
 Çatalyazı
 Çiçekpınar
 Dağyolu
 Enbiya
 Görpe
 Haydarlar
 Hocahacip
 İnciğez
 Kapaklı
 Kayapınar
 Kızıleller
 Koçcuğaz
 Obruk
 Örencik
 Sarıpınar
 Sepetçioğlu
 Sünlük
 Yarışlar

References

Districts of Kastamonu Province